Sili Bank, also known as Korea 626 Shenyang Co., is a North Korean financial company that provides email services in North Korea through its  domain.

Sili Bank ( meaning "true profit" in both Chinese and Korean) was established on September 12, 2001. Through its operation centre in Chilbosan Hotel in Shenyang, China, it offered a limited email relay service to and from North Korea, where Internet access was and is scarce. It initially charged a fee per every email sent. 

The Chilbosan Hotel has also served as a centre of North Korean computer hacking and cyber-warfare operations.

See also 

 Communications in North Korea

References

Further reading 
 Website offers email links to N. Korea  (The New York Times, November 1, 2001)
 North Korea opens door to e-mail  (ITworld, November 6, 2001)

External links 
 Sili Bank official site  (in English, Korean, Simplified Chinese and Japanese)

Banks of North Korea
Internet in North Korea